Zvonimir "Zvonko" Sabolović (23 June 1923 – 5 May 2008) was a Yugoslav and Croatian sprinter. He competed in the men's 400 metres at the 1948 Summer Olympics.

References

External links
 

1923 births
2008 deaths
Athletes (track and field) at the 1948 Summer Olympics
Yugoslav male sprinters
Croatian male sprinters
Olympic athletes of Yugoslavia
People from Križevci
Mediterranean Games silver medalists for Yugoslavia
Mediterranean Games bronze medalists for Yugoslavia
Mediterranean Games medalists in athletics
Athletes (track and field) at the 1951 Mediterranean Games